Billy Rose's Jumbo is a 1962 American musical film released by Metro-Goldwyn-Mayer and starring Doris Day, Stephen Boyd, Jimmy Durante, and Martha Raye. An adaptation of the stage musical Jumbo produced by Billy Rose, the film was directed by Charles Walters, written by Sidney Sheldon, and featured Busby Berkeley's choreography. It was nominated for an Academy Award for the adaptation of its Rodgers and Hart score.

The Broadway show Jumbo opened on November 16, 1935, and was the last musical produced at the New York Hippodrome before it was demolished in 1939. Original producer Billy Rose stipulated that if a film version was ever made, he must be credited in the title, even if he were not personally involved. Both play and film feature songs by Richard Rodgers and Lorenz Hart, although the film borrows two songs from Rodgers and Hart shows other than Jumbo (including "This Can't Be Love", from The Boys from Syracuse). Despite featuring such Rodgers and Hart standards as "My Romance" and "The Most Beautiful Girl in the World", neither the original play nor the film was especially successful. The film was Doris Day's last screen musical.

Stephen Boyd's singing voice was dubbed by Los Angeles studio singer, Jimmy Joyce. On April 2, 2007, Robert Osborne of TCM, introducing the MGM film Fearless Fagan (1952) directed by Stanley Donen, said that Donen was due to direct Jumbo right after Singin' in the Rain in 1952. However, MGM decided the script was not ready, so Jumbo was not filmed until 1962 with a different director and stars. Both play and film feature Durante leading a live elephant and being stopped by a police officer, who asks him, "What are you doing with that elephant?" Durante's reply, "What elephant?", was a show-stopper in 1935. This comedy bit was reprised in his role in Billy Rose's Jumbo and is likely to have contributed to the popularity of the idiom, the "elephant in the room".

Plot
The Wonder Circus comes to a town in the Midwest with its featured attraction, Jumbo the elephant. Pop Wonder owns the circus, but his continued gambling losses in crap games leaves him (and the circus) with an ever-growing number of IOUs.

His daughter, Kitty Wonder, hires a newcomer, Sam Rawlins, as both a performer and tent hand. She is unaware that Sam is the son of circus mogul John Noble, whose ambition is to buy the Wonder Circus for himself. Noble has been quietly buying up the IOUs with Sam's help and abruptly takes control of the family's business, leaving the Wonders without a show.

Kitty, Pop and his longtime fiancée Lulu go off on their own, forming a traveling carnival, but it isn't quite the same. Sam, however, has fallen in love with Kitty and has a guilty conscience about what he has done. Sam splits from his father and rejoins the Wonders, bringing with him an old friend of theirs, Jumbo.

Cast
 Doris Day as Kitty Wonder
 Stephen Boyd as Sam Rawlins
 Jimmy Joyce as Sam's singing voice
 Jimmy Durante as 'Pop' Wonder
 Martha Raye as Lulu
 Dean Jagger as John Noble
 Joseph Waring as Harry
 Lynn Wood as Tina
 Charles Watts as Ellis
 James Chandler as Parsons
 Robert Burton as Madison
 Wilson Wood as Hank
 Norman Leavitt as Eddie
 Grady Sutton as Driver
 Janos Prohaska as Circus Performer
 John Astin as	Pilot (uncredited)
 Billy Barty as Joey the Circus Clown (uncredited)
 Chuck Haren as Lennie (uncredited)
 Paul Wexler as Sharpie (uncredited)

Production
MGM bought the rights to the musical soon after it reached the stage. In 1947 Charles Walters requested he make the film of the musical as his first assignment; the studio agreed. In 1950 it was announced Arthur Freed would produce and Howard Keel and Jimmy Durante would star. Production was held up due to litigation. Years later MGM made the movie.

Soundtrack
A soundtrack album Billy Rose's Jumbo of the film was issued by Columbia Records in 1962.

Reception
According to MGM accounts, the film earned $2.5 million in the US and Canada and $1.5 million overseas, but because of its high cost recorded a loss of $3,956,000. It was the last film producer Joe Pasternak made at MGM.

The film is recognized by American Film Institute in these lists:
 2006: AFI's Greatest Movie Musicals – Nominated

DVD
Billy Rose's Jumbo was released to DVD in a Region 1 DVD by Warner Bros. on April 26, 2005, and also as part of Volumes 1 and 2 of The Doris Day Collection on April 10, 2007.

See also
 List of American films of 1962

References

External links

 
 
 
 

1962 films
1962 musical comedy films
1962 romantic comedy films
American musical comedy films
American romantic comedy films
American romantic musical films
Circus films
Films about elephants
Films based on musicals
Films directed by Charles Walters
Films produced by Joe Pasternak
Films scored by Georgie Stoll
Metro-Goldwyn-Mayer films
Films with screenplays by Ben Hecht
Films with screenplays by Sidney Sheldon
1960s English-language films
1960s American films